The Prima Esposizione Internazionale d'Arte Decorativa Moderna, held in Turin, Italy in 1902 (opened 10 May), was a world arts exhibition that was important in spreading the popularity of Art Nouveau design, especially to Italy. Its aim was explicitly modern: "Only original products that show a decisive tendency toward aesthetic renewal of form will be admitted. Neither mere imitations of past styles nor industrial products not inspired by an artistic sense will be accepted."

The chief architect was Raimondo D'Aronco who modelled his pavilions on those of Joseph Maria Olbrich in Darmstadt.

Numerous interiors were on display, including "A Lady's Writing Room" designed by Frances MacDonald and Herbert MacNair of the Glasgow School.

See also 
 Turin International (1911)
 The International Expo of Sport (1955)
 Expo 61
 List of world's fairs

References

1902 in Italy
Art Nouveau exhibitions
World's fairs in Turin
Italian design
Art Nouveau architecture in Italy
Buildings and structures completed in 1902
1902 festivals
20th century in Turin